A döntőkben elhangzott dalok is the debut album from Hungarian singer, Magdolna Rúzsa. The translated title reads Song Performances in the Finals. This album contains her live performances on the TV show Megasztár. It was certified three times platinum in Hungary with more than 70,000 copies sold.

Track listing

Magdi Rúzsa albums
2006 debut albums